Richard Watson (born 1961) is an English author, lecturer and futurist known for his 2007 book Future Files: a Brief History of The Next 50 Years and for his infographics, especially his Trends & Technology Timeline 2010-2050 and the Timeline of Emerging Science and Technology 2015-2030.

He has written five books about the future  and is the founder of What's Next, a website that documents global trends. He has been a blogger on innovation for Fast Company Magazine and has written about creativity, innovation, and future thinking for a variety of publications including Future Orientation (Copenhagen Institute for Future Studies) and What Matters (McKinsey & Company).  He is a proponent of scenario planning and an advocate of preferred futures, believing it is incumbent upon organisations to create compelling visions of the future and work towards their realisation.

In addition to writing, Watson works with the Technology Foresight Practice  at Imperial College London and Lectures at London Business School and the King's Fund. He is also a network member of Stratforma and has worked with the Strategic Trends Unit at the UK Ministry of Defence, the RAND Corporation, CSIRO, the Cabinet Office and the Departments of Education in the UK and Australia.

Personal life 
Richard Watson was born in the UK, but holds a dual British–Australian citizenship. He is married with two boys, with whom he enjoys practising hobbies like gardening, driving old cars and writing.

Books
 Translated to Hungarian, Korean, Turkish, Croatian, Lithuanian, Portuguese, Arabic, Indonesian, Russian, Persian, Bulgarian, Czech and Thai. 
 Translated to Japanese, Korean, Serbian, Spanish, Thai, Chinese (traditional complex characters). 

Watson, Richard (2016), Digital Vs Human: How We'll Live, Love and Think in the Future. Scribe Publishing.

References

External links 

1961 births
English writers
Academics of London Business School
Living people